Edward Lionel Peck (born March 6, 1929) is a retired career United States diplomat who served 32 years in the U.S. Foreign Service (from 1956 until 1989).

Early life and career
Born to immigrant parents, Ambassador Edward Peck served as Special Assistant to the Under Secretary of State for Political Affairs in the Nixon Administration, January 1971. He was Chief of Mission in Mauritania and in Iraq, and later held senior posts in Washington and abroad. He also served as a Foreign Service Officer in Morocco, Algeria, Tunisia and Egypt. At the State Department he served as Deputy Director of Covert Intelligence Programs, Director of the Office of Egyptian Affairs. He served as Deputy Director of the White House Task Force on Terrorism in the Reagan Administration. He is president of Foreign Services International, a consulting firm that works with governments, businesses and educational institutions across the world.

In retirement, he has served as Executive Secretary, American Academy of Diplomacy; Chair of Political Tradecraft Programs, National Foreign Affairs Training Center; Distinguished Visitor, National War College; Visiting Fellow, Woodrow Wilson Foundation; Senior Fellow, Joint Forces Staff College; and board member, Americans for Middle East Understanding. 

He has presented programs on International Relations for the Foreign Ministries of Thailand and Malaysia, and has spoken in the US Capitol, the Israeli Knesset, UN headquarters, and UN conferences in Beijing and Caracas.

Ambassador Peck is a regular speaker at US Department of Defense schools, universities, World Affairs Councils, and cruise lines. He has made more than 100 world affairs appearances on television and radio in the US and other countries. People Magazine named him a "Top Ten Commentator" during the first Gulf War.

A paratrooper, he had two U.S. tours of active duty in World War II and Korea, advancing from Private to 1st Lieutenant.

Personal life
Edward Peck resides in Chevy Chase, Maryland, with his wife Ann. He is the father of four grown children. Peck has a B.S. from the University of California, Los Angeles (1956) and Master of Business Administration from the George Washington University School of Business (1973).

References

External links
 Rethinking Iraq: An American Ambassador's Experience in Baghdad
   CNI and the Palestinian Election
  CNI Delegation Visits Hebron, Meets with Hamas Leader
 Chief-of-Mission Authority: A Powerful but Underused Tool
 

1929 births
Living people
Ambassadors of the United States to Mauritania
Reagan administration personnel
People from Chevy Chase, Maryland
University of California, Los Angeles alumni
George Washington University School of Business alumni
United States Army officers
United States Foreign Service personnel